Mactier or MacTier may refer to:

Katie Mactier (born 1975), Australian cyclist
Robert MacTier (1890–1918), Australian recipient of the Victoria Cross
MacTier, a community in Georgian Bay, Ontario, Canada

See also
Alexander Mactier Pirrie (1882–1907), British anthropologist
McTier